A list of all windmills and windmill sites which lie in the current Ceremonial county of Kent.

Locations

A

B

C

D

E

F

G

H

I

K

L

M

N

O

P

Q

R

S

T

U

W

Y

Locations formerly within Kent
For windmills in Bexley, Blackheath, Bromley, Chelsfield, Chislehurst, Deptford, Downe, Eltham, Erith, Greenwich, Keston, Lee, Plumstead Common, Sydenham and Woolwich see List of windmills in Greater London. For the windmill closely associated with Bexley Heath, see the entry under Crayford (above).

Maps

The maps quoted by date are:

1414 – Thomas of Elmham (map of Thanet)
1596 – Phil Symondson
1610 – John Speed
1695 – Robert Morden
1719 – Dr Harris
1736 – Emanuel Bowen
1769 – Andrews, Dury and Herbert
1829 – Greenwood & Co

See also
 Mills in Canterbury

Notes
Mills in bold are still standing, known building dates are indicated in bold.

 Coles Finch states that the mill moved from Playden to Appledore had originally stood at Playden, been moved to Appledore and then moved to Rye, East Sussex (Playden is very close to Rye) before being moved back to Appledore for a second time. Which of the sites it occupied in Appledore after the first move is not recorded.

References

Citations

General sources 

 
Kent
Windmills